Imbricaria hrdlickai is a species of sea snail, a marine gastropod mollusk in the family Mitridae, the miters or miter snails.

Description
The length of the shell varies between 12 mm and 30 mm.

Distribution
This marine species occurs off the Philippines, New Guinea and the Solomon Islands.

References

 Salisbury R. 1994. La Conchiglia 272:11-13

External links
 Gastropods.com: Subcancilla hrdlickai

Mitridae
Gastropods described in 1994